The Africa Movie Academy Award for Best Makeup is an annual merit by the Africa Film Academy to reward the best transformation in a film for the year.

References

Film awards for makeup and hairstyling
Africa Movie Academy Awards